Central Institute of Tool Design or CITD is an institute in  India providing programs in Tool Engineering and Technology . The CITD main campus is in Hyderabad, Telangana, with a branch campus in Vijayawada and an extension centre in Chennai.

History
The institute was established in 1968 by the government of India with the assistance of United Nations Development Programme (UNDP) and the International Labour Organization (ILO) as an executing agency.

Objective
The objective of CITD is to meet the requirements of industry in the fields of tool design and manufacture and to train technical personnel in these fields. The institute has strong links with industries to impart practical knowledge by way of undertaking tooling assignments.

Functions
1) to provide consultancy and advisory services including assistance in the design and development of tools.
2) to recommend measures to standardise tools, and tooling elements, components of jigs, fixtures, dies etc.
3) to provide skill development in cutting edge technologies like CAD/CAM, AI, Electronics, Pneumatic, civil.

Facilities
The Central Institute of Tool Design has a tool room with sophisticated CNC machines like CNC EDM (Charmilles Roboform 54), CNC Wirecut EDM (AGIE Cut Classic-III & Electronics), 4- and 5-Axis High-Speed Machining Centres, Kellenberger CNC Cylindrical Grinding Machine and 3D Coordinate measuring machine with scanning and digitization facilities. The institute is equipped with EMCO table top CNC turning and milling machines with closed loop systems to impart training in CNC Programming.

The calibration laboratory has Universal Horizontal metroscope ULM OPAL 600 Carl Zeiss Technology (Germany) and Slip Gauge Measuring Unit 826 with Millitron 1240 (Mahr, Germany) to calibrate limit gauges, micrometers, dial indicators, etc. The Automation Centre is equipped with simulator training kits like Advanced Pneumatics Trainer, Advanced Electro Pneumatics Trainer with PID controls,  Advanced Hydraulics Trainer, Advanced Electro Hydraulics Trainer, Closed-loop Hydraulics Trainer with PID Controls, PLC Trainer, Sensors Technology Trainer, Modular Production System with testing, processing, handling and sorting stations, cut section models of elements, transparent working models of hydraulics element etc.

The CAD/CAM Centre is equipped with hardware like Compaq workstations, IBM, DELL systems, Pentium IV systems and software like AutoCAD, MDT Ideas NX11, Pro-E Wildfire, Catia V5, UG, Ansys, Nastran, Hypermesh, MasterCam, DelCam, SolidWork, Solid edge, etc.

CITD has a library with a collection of technical books in tool engineering. IT subscribes to international journals like CIRP Annals, American Machinist, Journal of Engineering Materials & Technology (ASME), Precision Engineering (Japan), Precision Tool Maker, etc. For the dissemination of information, the centre publishes a computerised current awareness abstracting bulletin and provides a technical enquiry service. The institute extends its services to developing countries by imparting knowledge and skills to their personnel in the field of Tool Design, CAD/CAM and Low-Cost Automation Techniques.

Activities
CITD conducts regular and part-time training programmes in the field of Tool Design & Manufacture, Low Cost Automation, Mechatronics and Computer Aided Design & Computer Aided Manufacture. It conducts short-term courses, special-purpose clinics in Tool Engineering, seminars, tailor-made programmes, in disciplines for the benefit of working personnel.

CITD provides a consultancy and servicing facility to industry, including assistance in design and development of tools, and it also recommends measures to standardise tools and tooling elements, components of jigs and fixtures, dies and moulds and other tools. CITD is a member on technical committees of the Bureau of Indian Standards.

References

External links
 Official website

Universities and colleges in Hyderabad, India
Ministry of Micro, Small and Medium Enterprises
1968 establishments in Andhra Pradesh
Educational institutions established in 1968